Mange is a skin disease.

Mange may also refer to:
 several other skin diseases like demodectic mange, psoroptic mange, or notoedric mange
 Mange Temple, in China

People with the name
 Anil Mange Bollywood film actor
 Gloria Mange (born 1931), Mexican actress
 José Mange (1866–1935), French painter
 Mangé Demba (died 1822), African ruler
 Mange Ram Garg (1935/6–2019), Indian politician
 Mange Schmidt (born 1973), Swedish rapper
 Pierre Mange (1905–1992), Swiss equestrian

See also
 Blancmange (food)
 Mangue (disambiguation)
 Manj (disambiguation)